Statistics of Football Clubs Association Championship in the 1924–25 season.

Athens Football Clubs Association

Group A

Group B

Athens Final Round

|+Semi-finals

|}

|+Final

|}

Panathinaikos won the championship.

Piraeus Football Clubs Association

Group A

Group B

Piraeus Final Round

|+Semi-finals

|}

The final took place on 17 May 1925 at Leoforos Alexandras Stadium.

|+Final

|}

Olympiacos won the championship.

External links
Rsssf 1924–25 championship

 

Panhellenic Championship seasons
1924–25 in Greek football
1924–25 domestic association football leagues